The 1956 season was the 51st season of competitive football in Norway.

Hovedserien 1955/56

Group A

Group B

Championship final
June 3: Larvik Turn-Fredrikstad 3-2

Landsdelsserien 1955/56

Group Østland/Søndre

Group Østland/Nordre

Group Sørland/Vestland, A1

Group Sørland/Vestland, A2

Group Sørland/Vestland, B

Group Møre

Group Trøndelag

Play-off Sørland/Vestland
June 3: Ulf - Start 6-3

June 10: Årstad - Ulf 2-0

Årstad promoted.

Play-off Møre/Trøndelag
June 3: Molde - Steinkjer 2-4

June 10: Steinkjer - Molde 3-2 (agg. 7–4)

Steinkjer promoted.

First Division

District I
 1. Lisleby (Promoted)
 2. Selbak
 3. Sprint/Jeløy
 4. Hafslund
 5. Borgen
 6. Tune
 7. Torp
 8. Askim

District II, Group A
 1. Mjøndalen (Play-off)
 2. Åssiden
 3. Geithus
 4. Sagene
 5. Jevnaker
 6. Solberg
 7. Steinberg
 8. Liull

District II, Group B
 1. Spartacus (Play-off)
 2. Sandaker
 3. Bjørkelangen
 4. Grue
 5. Grüner
 6. Sørli
 7. Aurskog
 8. Aasen

District III
 1. Hamarkameratene (Play-off)
 2. Fremad
 3. Einastrand
 4. Vardal
 5. Gjøvik SK
 6. Mesna
 7. Vang
 8. Stange

District IV, Group A
 1. Eik (Play-off)
 2. Tønsberg Turn
 3. Urædd
 4. Brevik
 5. Kragerø
 6. Teie
 7. Tønsbergkam.
 8. Sem

District IV, Group B
 1. Storm (Play-off)
 2. Borg
 3. Rjukan
 4. Ulefoss
 5. Gjerpen
 6. Drangedal
 7. Skiens BK
 8. Gvarv

District V, Group A1 (Aust-Agder)
 1. Risør (Play-off)
 2. Trauma
 3. Rygene
 4. Dristug
 5. Arendals BK
 Tvedestrand (withdrew)

District V, Group A2 (Vest-Agder)
 1. Vindbjart (Play-off)
 2. AIK Lund
 3. Vigør
 4. Mandalskam.
 5. Farsund
 6. Våg

District V, Group B1 (Rogaland)
 1. Nærbø (Promoted)
 2. Ålgård
 3. Randaberg
 4. Egersund
 5. Klepp
 6. Brusand

District V, Group B2 (Rogaland)
 1. Jarl (Promoted)
 2. Buøy
 3. Haugar
 4. Torvastad
 5. Vaulen
 6. Riska

District VI, Group A (Bergen)
 1. Hardy (Play-off)
 2. Sandviken
 3. Fjellkameratene
 4. Viggo
 5. Laksevåg
 6. Trane
 7. Minde

District VI, Group B (Midthordland)
 1. Erdal (Play-off)
 2. Voss
 3. Florvåg
 4. Eidsvåg (Åsane)
 5. Ålvik
 6. Fyllingen
 7. Kjøkkelvik

District VII, Group A (Sunnmøre)
 1. Rollon (Play-off)
 2. Herd
 3. Volda
 4. Aksla
 5. Velled./Ringen
 6. Sykkylven
 7. Hareid
 8. Ørsta

District VII, Group B (Romsdal)
 1. Kleive (Play-off)
 2. Åndalsnes
 3. Eide
 4. Måndalen
 5. Isfjorden
 6. Frode
 7. Olymp (withdrew)

District VII, Group C (Nordmøre)
 1. Framtid (Play-off)
 2. Dahle
 3. Goma
 4. Halsa
 5. Sunndal
 6. Tingvoll
 7. Nordlandet
 8. Enge

District VIII, Group A1 (Sør-Trøndelag)
 1. Heimdal (Play-off)
 2. Melhus
 3. Flå
 4. Leik
 5. Leinstrand
Hommelvik (disqualified)

District VIII, Group A2 (Nord-Trøndelag)
 1. Troll (Play-off)
 2. Orkanger
 3. Løkken
 4. Rindal
 5. Svorkmo
 6. Orkdal

District VIII, Group B (Trondheim og omegn)
 1. Trond (Play-off)
 2. National
 3. Tryggkameratene
 4. Nidar
 5. Ørn (Trondheim)
 6. Strindheim
 7. NTHI
 8. Rapp

District VIII, Group C (Fosen)
 1. Opphaug (Play-off)
 2. Fevåg
 3. Stadsbygd
 4. Lensvik
 5. Beian
 6. Uthaug
 Rissa (withdrew)

District VIII, Group D (Nord-Trøndelag/Namdal)
 1. Nessegutten (Play-off)
 2. Verdal
 3. Neset
 4. Namsos
 5. Malm
 6. Fram (Skatval)
 7. Byafossen
Blink (withdrew and merged with Stjørdal)

District IX
 1. Mo
 2. Bodø/Glimt
 3. Brønnøysund
 4. Mosjøen
 5. Grand
 6. Saltdalkam.

District X
 1. Harstad
 2. Mjølner
 3. Narvik/Nor
 4. Tromsø
 5. Finnsnes
 6. Ballangen

Play-off District II/III
Spartacus - Mjøndalen 1-2

Mjøndalen - Hamarkameratene 3-1

Hamarkameratene - Spartacus 2-4

Championship District II
Spartacus - Mjøndalen 1-2

Play-off District IV
Eik - Storm 2-0

Storm - Eik 0-5 (agg. 0–7)

Eik promoted

Play-off District V
Vindbjart - Risør 0-3

Risør - Vindbjart 2-4 (agg. 5–4)

Risør promoted.

Championship District V
Jarl - Nærbø 6-3

Nærbø - Jarl 1-1 (agg. 4–7)

Risør - Jarl 2-5

Play-off District VI
Hardy - Erdal 1-0

Hardy promoted.

Play-off District VII
Kleive - Rollon 1-2

Framtid - Kleive 7-0

Rollon - Framtid 1-3

Play-off District VIII
Heimdal - Troll?

Opphaug - Troll 1-7

Trond - Nessegutten 0-1

Opphaug - Trond 1-3

Troll - Nessegutten 2-3

Nessegutten - Opphaug 7-1

Troll - Trond 3-1

Relegation play-off District II
Steinberg - Aurskog 0-8

Steinberg relegated.

National Cup

Final

Northern Norwegian Cup

Final

National team

Note: Norway's goals first 
Explanation:
F = Friendly
October 28: Poland – Norway 5-3

 
Seasons in Norwegian football